Nitron can refer to:

 The original Greek form of the word nitre, whence nitrogen
 A finish applied to certain firearms; see ferritic nitrocarburizing
 The ring name of Canadian actor and former professional wrestler Daryl Karolat, who is better known by the stage name Tyler Mane
 A fictional element which was being extracted from the Earth's atmosphere in Flash Gordon's Trip to Mars (1938)
 The humanoid warrior from the series Tattooed Teenage Alien Fighters from Beverly Hills
 A chemical compound with the formula C20H16N4